An earthquake struck the Mexican state of Oaxaca at 10:29 local time on June 23, 2020, with a magnitude of 7.4 . Thousands of houses in Oaxaca were damaged and 10 deaths were reported. A tsunami warning was issued for southern Mexico, El Salvador, Guatemala, and Honduras.

Tectonic setting
Oaxaca lies above the convergent boundary where the Cocos Plate is being subducted beneath the North American Plate. The rate of convergence in this part of the boundary is 60 mm per year. This boundary is associated with many damaging earthquakes; along the plate interface, within the descending Cocos slab and within the overriding North American Plate. The most recent event in the same region as the 2020 earthquakes was the 2018 Oaxaca earthquake, which struck 225 km to the northwest. 6-year catalog of seismicity states that Oaxaca had had over 14,000 earthquakes near or in the region since 1995. The reason is that Oaxaca is in a region with many shallow subduction angles. 25 percent of all the earthquakes in Mexico are in Oaxaca. Oaxaca is near the Tehuantepec fracture zone, which is where the plates stick together causing frictions leading to earthquakes. Oaxaca collides with Cocos, North American and the Caribbean plate making it the perfect formula for big and dangerous plates.

Earthquake

The depth and the observed focal mechanism are consistent with displacement on the plate interface. Aftershocks and smaller quakes continued through Tuesday afternoon, and could be felt by residents of Oaxaca.

Damage 
Widespread damage was reported from Oaxaca, with over 8,000 houses affected across 145 of the state's 570 municipalities. Other damaged structures included 213 schools, 15 health centers, three hospitals, 7 bridges and 25 sections of state highways. Streets and buildings were also shaken in Mexico City, and damage was observed in at least 14 buildings across the city, including the collapse of a single floor residence and 3 buildings already seriously damaged by the 2017 Puebla earthquake. Oaxaca’s governor said that there were around 500 houses that have been damages by the earthquake. Also an archeological museum and a few schools were affected by the earthquake. They estimate the total cost in damages is around 100 million.  Houses were scarred by wide cracks across walls and residents sought to clear debris from the streets.  Experts said that its location off the coast helps explain the relatively limited damage.

Casualties
Ten people were killed in Oaxaca, and 25 people were injured. Most casualties were due to structural failure. A worker at the PEMEX oil refinery in Salina Cruz fell to his death from the top of a structure. A fire at the refinery injured another worker, although the fire was extinguished quickly.

Response 
Due to the frequency of earthquakes in Mexico because its tectonic setting the Mexican government has been able to get better in their response. The Mexican government sent out a warning about the incoming earthquake with its alert system this allowed the residents to have enough time to get outdoors where it was safe. With some hospitals being damaged during the earthquake some patients had to be evacuated until it was safe to return.

Tsunami
After the earthquake, warnings for a tsunami were set out for a radius of  allowing people to be prepared and stay alert.

See also

List of earthquakes in 2020
List of earthquakes in Mexico

Further reading

References

2020 earthquakes
Earthquakes in Mexico
History of Oaxaca
June 2020 events in Mexico
2020 disasters in Mexico